Jabaal Lamar Sheard (born May 10, 1989) is an American football defensive end who is a free agent. He played college football for the University of Pittsburgh, and was drafted by the Cleveland Browns in the second round of the 2011 NFL Draft. He has also played for the New England Patriots, with whom he won Super Bowl LI.

Early years
Sheard was an All-Broward County defensive lineman who had 54 tackles and 11 sacks as a senior at Hollywood Hills, a Florida 5A (second largest classification) school. He was rated as the nation's No. 23 weakside defensive end and was one of the top 60 prospects in the state of Florida according to Rivals.com. He was a PrepStar All-Southeast Region.He was rated one of the top 100 prospects in Florida by SuperPrep. He was rated one of the top 75 prospects in the southeast region by Scout.com.

Sheard was also a track and field letterman. In 2007, he placed fourth in the shot put at the FHSAA Outdoor State Championships with a throw of 16.20 meters (53-0). He also earned All-Broward County honors in the discus. He was timed at 4.6 in the 40-yard dash at the Nike combine prior to his senior season.

College career
Sheard was described as someone who didn't get enough credit on the Pittsburgh defensive line and noted for his "extraordinary game" against Notre Dame and the pressure he put on quarterback Jimmy Clausen. He had four tackles, two tackles for loss, one sack, one pass breakup and four quarterback hurries in the game, as he "simply overwhelmed right tackle Sam Young off the edge with his speed". Commentator Wes Bunting describes Sheard, a 6–4, 260-pound lineman, as being balanced and exhibiting impressive body control, "an explosive first step", and "keeping his pad level down and making himself small when turning the corner". As a junior in 2009 Sheard was overshadowed by teammate and fellow defensive lineman Greg Romeus, but "is a gifted pass rusher in his own right, and his combination of burst, balance and closing speed will find him a spot on an NFL roster". Dave Wannstedt, Pittsburgh's coach and a former National Football League (NFL) coach has also said that he thinks Sheard and Romeus will both play in the NFL.

Teammate Brandon Lindsey, who believes Romeus and Sheard, credited them with helping him develop as a player saying, "They’ve really shown me how to work hard every day in practice and to not get frustrated when things don’t go your way." The Panthers lead the country in sacks.

Sheard was suspended from the Pitt Football team indefinitely after his July 18, 2010 arrest on charges stemming from an off-campus brawl that occurred on East Carson Street in Pittsburgh. He was restored to the team after charges were reduced to a misdemeanor disorderly conduct, and paid restitution for injuries and damages incurred during the fight.

Sheard earned first-team American Football Coaches Association All-American honors in 2010 and was named as one of six finalists for the Ted Hendricks Award for the years best defensive end.

Professional career

Cleveland Browns
Sheard was selected with the 37th overall pick in the second round of the 2011 NFL Draft by the Cleveland Browns.

In 2011, Sheard started all 16 games for the Browns and led the team in sacks (8.5) and forced fumbles (5). Sheard and teammate Phil Taylor were chosen to the Pro Football Weekly 2011 All-Rookie Team. Sheard recorded his first career sack and forced fumble against the Indianapolis Colts in week 2 and recorded a career-high 2 sacks against the Arizona Cardinals in week 15.

In 2012, Sheard started all 16 games for the Browns, recording 7.0 sacks and 36 tackles to cap a productive year.

Limited by injury, Sheard started 13 games in 2013. He recorded 5.5 sacks and 19 tackles.

Sheard improved in 2014 under a new coaching staff led by head coach Mike Pettine. During the 2014 season, he started all 16 games and ended the year on a solid note with 44 combined tackles (25 solo, 19 assisted) and 2 sacks.

New England Patriots
As a free agent, Sheard signed a two-year, $11 million contract with the New England Patriots on March 11, 2015. He made an immediate impact on the Patriots' defense, collecting four sacks in his first four games. He finished the season with 37 tackles, 8 sacks, and two passes defensed.

After Chandler Jones was traded to the Arizona Cardinals during the offseason, Sheard was expected to fill his starting role on the defensive line. In Week 3, he sacked Brock Osweiler twice in a 27-0 shutout win against the Texans. On February 5, 2017, Sheard was part of the Patriots team that won Super Bowl LI. In the game, he recorded two tackles and 0.5 sacks as the Patriots defeated the Atlanta Falcons by a score of 34–28 in overtime. The Patriots trailed 28–3 in the third quarter and rallied back to win the game, which featured the first overtime game in Super Bowl history.

Indianapolis Colts
On March 10, 2017, Sheard signed a three-year, $25.5 million deal with the Indianapolis Colts. Sheard was switched to an OLB due to the Colt's 3-4 scheme. He again made an immediate impact on the Colts' defense, collecting 5.5 sacks and 52 tackles over the course of the 2017 season.

After the 2017 season, the Colts fired Chuck Pagano and hired Frank Reich. The Colts then returned to a 4-3 defense and Sheard was moved back to defensive end.

Jacksonville Jaguars
On October 12, 2020, Sheard was signed to the Jacksonville Jaguars' practice squad. He was elevated to the active roster on October 17 for the team's week 6 game against the Detroit Lions, and reverted to the practice squad after the game.

New York Giants
On October 20, 2020, Sheard was signed by the New York Giants off the Jaguars practice squad. In Week 12 against the Cincinnati Bengals, Sheard secured a 19–17 Giants victory by stripping Bengals backup quarterback Brandon Allen on the 50 yard line late in the fourth quarter, very close to field-goal range for kicker Randy Bullock.

Miami Dolphins
On September 1, 2021, Sheard was signed to the Miami Dolphins practice squad. He was released on November 16.

NFL statistics

References

External links

 
 Indianapolis Colts bio 
 New England Patriots bio 
 Pittsburgh Panthers bio

1989 births
Living people
Sportspeople from Hollywood, Florida
Players of American football from Florida
Hollywood Hills High School alumni
American football defensive ends
Pittsburgh Panthers football players
Cleveland Browns players
New England Patriots players
Indianapolis Colts players
Jacksonville Jaguars players
New York Giants players
Miami Dolphins players
Ed Block Courage Award recipients